The 2011 Challenger Ciudad de Guayaquil was a professional tennis tournament played on clay courts. It was the seventh edition of the tournament which is part of the 2011 ATP Challenger Tour. It took place in Guayaquil, Ecuador between 21 and 27 November 2011.

Singles main draw entrants

Seeds

 1 Rankings are as of November 14, 2011.

Other entrants
The following players received wildcards into the singles main draw:
  Júlio César Campozano
  Diego Hidalgo
  Nicolás Massú
  Roberto Quiroz

The following players received entry from the qualifying draw:
  Guillermo Duran
  Guido Pella
  Pedro Sousa
  Leonardo Tavares

The following players received entry as a lucky loser into the singles main draw:
  Guido Andreozzi
  Iván Endara
  Juan Sebastián Gómez

Champions

Singles

 Matteo Viola def.  Guido Pella, 6–4, 6–1

Doubles

 Júlio César Campozano /  Roberto Quiroz def.  Marcel Felder /  Rodrigo Grilli, 6–4, 6–1

External links
Official Website
ITF Search
ATP official site

Challenger Ciudad de Guayaquil
Clay court tennis tournaments
Tennis tournaments in Ecuador
Challenger Ciudad de Guayaquil